Foam rubber (also known as cellular rubber, sponge rubber, or expanded rubber) refers to rubber that has been manufactured with a foaming agent to create an air-filled matrix structure. Commercial foam rubbers are generally made of synthetic rubber, natural latex or polyurethane. Latex foam rubber, used in mattresses, is well known for its endurance. Polyurethane is a thermosetting polymer that comes from combination of Methyl di-isocyanate and polyethylene and some other chemical additives.

Manufacturing history
Foam rubber was first produced in 1929 by Dunlop Rubber researcher chemists E. A. Murphy and Eric Owen using whipped latex. In 1937 isocyanate based materials were first used for the formation of foam rubbers, after World War II styrene-butadiene rubber replaced many natural types of foam. Foam rubbers have been used commercially for a wide range of applications since around the 1940s.

Polyether polyurethane rubber was discovered and patented in the 1950s by Charles C. Price. Currently, polyurethane-based foams make up over 90%, by weight, of the entire market for polyurethanes. The largest amount of polyurethane is used by these industries: construction, transportation, home furniture, noise and vibration reduction, and carpet.  Construction uses 27% of polyurethane, and transportation uses 21%. Flexible foam is the leading material usage at 44% total volume, and rigid foam material at 28% of the United States market.

Manufacturing process
Rates of polymerization can range from many minutes to just a few seconds. Fast reacting polymers feature short cycle periods and require the use of machinery to thoroughly mix the reacting agents. Slow polymers may be mixed by hand, but require long periods on mixing, as a result industrial application tends to use machinery to mix products. Product processing can range from a variety of techniques including, but not limited to spraying, open pouring, and molding.
 Material preparation Liquid and solid material generally arrive on location via rail or truck, once unloaded liquid materials are stored in heated tanks.  When producing slabstock typically two or more polymers streams are used.
 Mixing Open pouring, better known as continuous dispensing is used primarily in the formation of rigid, low density foams. Specific amounts of chemicals are mixed into a mixing head, much like an industrial blender. The foam is poured onto a conveyor belt, where it then cures for cutting.
 Curing and cutting After curing on the conveyor belt the foam is then forced through a horizontal band saw. This band saw cuts the pieces in a set size for the application. General contracting uses 4’x12’x2’’.
 Further processing Once cut and cured the slabstock can either be sold or a lamination process can be applied. This process turns the slabstock into a rigid foam board known as boardstock. Boardstock is used for metal roof insulation, oven insulation, and many other durable goods.

Physical properties
The main physical properties of foam rubber are generalized as being “Lightweight, buoyant, cushioning performance, thermal and acoustic insulation, impact damping and cost reduction”. Crosslinking technology is used in the formation of EVA based foams, including LLDPE, LDPE, HDPE, PP, and TPE. Crosslinking is the most important characteristic in the production of foam rubber to obtain the best possible foam expansion and physical properties. Crosslinking is defined as chemical bonding between polymer chains, and is used for foam rubber manufacturing to stabilize bubble expansion, enhanced resistance to thermal collapse and improve physical properties.

Recycling
Due to the variety in polyurethane chemistries, it is difficult to recycle foam materials using a single method. Reusing slab stock foams for carpet backing is how the majority of recycling is done. This method involves shredding the scrap and bonding the small flakes together to form sheets. Other methods involve breaking the foam down into granules and dispersing them into a polyol blend to be molded into the same part as the original. The recycling process is still ever developing for foam rubber and the future will hopefully unveil new and easier ways for recycling.

See also
 Polymeric foam
 Talalay process, a method of producing molded natural foam rubber of uniform density

References

 http://www.pfa.org/intouch/new_pdf/lr_IntouchV.8.pdf
 http://www.madehow.com/Volume-5/Foam-Rubber.html

Rubber